The 1987 Kilkenny Senior Hurling Championship was the 93rd staging of the Kilkenny Senior Hurling Championship since its establishment by the Kilkenny County Board.

Clara were the defending champions.

Glenmore won the championship after a 4-10 to 3-09 defeat of Ballyhale Shamrocks in the final. It was their first ever championship title.

References

Kilkenny Senior Hurling Championship
Kilkenny Senior Hurling Championship